The 2019 O'Byrne Cup was played by county teams of Leinster GAA in December 2018 and January 2019.

The draw took place on 26 September 2018.

Several new rules are being trialled in the competition: 
four consecutive handpasses were forbidden
the "advanced mark" was introduced
sideline kicks must go forward (unless inside the attacking 20-metre line)
all kickouts are from the 20-metre line
a "sin bin" for a black card offence.

It was won by Westmeath.

Competition format

One team (Dublin) received a bye to the semi-finals. The remaining ten teams were drawn to play in one group of four teams and two groups of three teams.

In the four-team group, each team plays the other teams in their group once. Two points are awarded for a win and one for a draw.

In the two three-team groups, each team played the other teams in their group once. Each team also played one game against a team from the other three-team group. Two points are awarded for a win and one for a draw.

The three group winners advanced to the semi-finals.

Group stage

Group 1

Three-team groups

Group 2

Group 3

Cross-group games
The three teams in Group 2 play the three teams in Group 3 with each team having a single game.

Knockout stage

Semi-finals

The three group winners plus the team given a bye (Dublin) compete in the semi-finals. The two winners advance to the final.

a penalty shoot-out was used as a tie-breaker (only goals counted)

Final

References

External links
Official site

O'Byrne Cup
O'Byrne Cup